Kinch is a surname originating from the United Kingdom, and may refer to:

Arturo Kinch (born 1956), Costa Rican olympic skier
Beverly Kinch (born 1964), British long jumper and sprinter
Chad Kinch (1958–1994), American basketball player
David Kinch, American chef
Matt Kinch (born 1980), Canadian ice hockey player
Myra Kinch (1904–1981), American choreographer
Soweto Kinch (born 1978), British saxophonist
Steve Kinch, bass guitar player from Manfred Mann's Earth Band